Parshuram is a town and municipality in Feni district in the division of Chittagong, Bangladesh. It is the administrative headquarter and urban centre of Parshuram Upazila.

References 

Populated places in Chittagong Division
Cities in Bangladesh

bn:পরশুরাম (শহর)